Snooker at the 1988 Summer Paralympics consisted of a men's open event. It was held at the Chung-Nip Polio Centre, Seoul.

There were twelve competitors, from six countries: three each from Great Britain and South Korea two each from Australia and Denmark, and one each from Egypt and the Republic of Ireland.

Mike Langley won the gold medal.

Snooker has not been included in the Paralympic Games since 1988.

Medal summary

References 

1988 Summer Paralympics events
1988
Paralympics